The women's vault competition at the 2018 Asian Games in Jakarta, Indonesia was held on 21 and 23 August 2018 at the Jakarta International Expo Hall D2.

Schedule
All times are Western Indonesia Time (UTC+07:00)

Results 
Legend
DNF — Did not finish
DNS — Did not start

Qualification

Final

References

Qualification
Final

External links
Official website

Artistic Women vault